Blaengwynfi is a village in the Afan Valley, in the Neath Port Talbot area of South Wales. It is in the community of Gwynfi and Croeserw,

Location
It is a part of the Upper Afan Valley. It used to be a coal mining village, and is directly below Abergwynfi. The source of the River Afan is at the top of the nearby mountain.

Transport
Blaengwynfi is on the A4107 road that links the Afan valley to the Rhondda valley.

Blaengwynfi railway station was on the Rhondda and Swansea Bay Railway, which operated from 1890 to 1968.

The Rhondda Tunnel carried the railway to Blaencwm in the Rhondda Valley. There are proposals to reopen the tunnel to pedestrians and cyclists.

Sport
Blaengwynfi is home to a local football team, Gwynfi United.

Notable residents
The Presbyterian minister, author and noted historian Tom Beynon (1886–1961) was Pastor of the Balengwynfi Tabernacle in 1916–1933.
Harry Hanford (1907–1995), born in Blaengwynfi, played as a footballer over 300 times in the Football League, for Swansea Town, Sheffield Wednesday and Exeter City. He was capped seven times for Wales.

References

External links
www.geograph.co.uk : photos of Blaengwynfi and surrounding area

Villages in Neath Port Talbot
Afan Valley